Sri Lanka National U-23 Team is the national team that participates in international football tournaments, such as the Summer Olympics and the AFC U-23 Championship representing Sri Lanka. The team has won bronze medals at the South Asian Games in 2004 and at the 2014 Lusophony Games. The Sri Lanka National U-23 Team won the silver medal at the 2006 South Asian Games, the first silver medal won by Sri Lanka at an international tournament.

Sri Lanka didn't have an official U-23 team. Before 2013, the Sri Lanka national football team participated in the Summer Olympic qualifications and other international events. Sri Lanka has yet to participate in a Summer Olympic football tournament.

History 
Due to the popularity of cricket in Sri Lanka, football has not been popular. But it has gained popularity with Sri Lanka's youth in recent years, and Sri Lanka's National U-23 Football team was formed as a result. In the 2010s the Sri Lanka national football team competed in international football tournaments. The Sri Lanka U-23 team has won a silver medal and two bronze medals in competitions.

The 10th edition of the South Asian Games was held in Sri Lanka in 2006. In the football tournament, Sri Lanka competed in the group stage against the Pakistan, Bhutan and Maldives U-23 football teams. Sri Lanka beat Maldives and Bhutan to qualify for the semi-final stage and beat India in penalties to qualify for the final with Pakistan. Sri Lanka won the silver medal as a result. In the 2004 tournament Sri Lanka had won the bronze medal.

Sri Lanka participated in the AFC U-23 Championship Qualifiers competition as an inexperienced football team, and failed to win a single match. They achieved a draw against Palestine, scoring their first goal in a major U-23 football tournament. They also tied with Pakistan but lost 4–0 to the powerful and experienced Syria national under-23 football team. Their fifth game was against host Saudi Arabia, and they lost 7–0, their biggest defeat in tournament play. In the last match of the qualifiers, Sri Lanka played against the Kyrgyzstan team and lost 5–0, failing to qualify for the inaugural AFC U-22 Championship tournament.

The Palestine Championship tournament was organized by the Palestinian Football Association, which invited the national U-23 teams of Palestine, Sri Lanka, Pakistan and Jordan to compete. Sri Lanka played all three teams and lost each match, failing to score a goal in the tournament.

The Sri Lanka national U-23 football team participated in the 2014 Lusophony Games. The Sri Lanka team advanced to the semi-final stage of the tournament by defeating Macau and drew against São Tomé and Príncipe. In the semi-finals Sri Lanka lost the match against Mozambique 1–0 and won the bronze medal match against Macau 3–0. This was the first time that Sri Lanka U-23 team had placed at a major international tournament.

Sri Lanka entered in the 2016 AFC U-23 Championship Qualification stage with the national U-23 teams from United Arab Emirates (UAE), Yemen and Tajikistan. Sri Lanka lost both opening games against the host UAE and Yemen 4–0 and 5–0. They lost to Tajikistan 5–1 in the last group match. Sri Lanka scored only one goal in the tournament. After losing all three matches, Sri Lanka failed to qualify for the 2016 Olympic Football Tournament.

Competitive record

Olympic Games 

Prior to the 2016 Olympic Games campaign, the senior national team played in qualification.

AFC U-23 Championship

South Asian Games 

Prior to the 2004 South Asian Games campaign, the senior national team played in the tournament.

Fixtures and results

2016

2017

2019

2021

Coaching staff

Squad 

|-----
! colspan="9" bgcolor="#B0D3FB" align="left" |
|----- bgcolor="#DFEDFD"
|-

|-----
! colspan="9" bgcolor="#B0D3FB" align="left" |
|----- bgcolor="#DFEDFD"
|-

|-----
! colspan="9" bgcolor="#B0D3FB" align="left" |
|----- bgcolor="#DFEDFD"
|-

Honors 
 Lusophony Games:
 Bronze Medal : 2014
 South Asian Games:
 Silver Medal : 2006
 Bronze Medal : 2004

See also 
Sri Lanka national football team
Sri Lanka women's national football team
Sri Lanka national under-20 football team
Sri Lanka national under-17 football team

References

External links 
 Football Federation of Sri Lanka
 Sri Lanka on FIFA

Football in Sri Lanka
Asian national under-23 association football teams
under-23